Maryna Novik (born 19 January 1984) is a female javelin thrower from Belarus. Her personal best throw is 63.25 metres, achieved in August 2009 in Minsk, which is the current national record. She competed at the 2008 Olympic Games but did not qualify for the final. She also competed at the 2012 Summer Olympics in London but again failed to reach the final and finished in 33rd position.

References

External links

1984 births
Living people
Belarusian female javelin throwers
Athletes (track and field) at the 2008 Summer Olympics
Athletes (track and field) at the 2012 Summer Olympics
Olympic athletes of Belarus